Apurv or Apurva is the common English spelling of two related Indian given names: the feminine अपूर्वा  and the masculine अपूर्व . The masculine name is often spelled Apurv or Apoorv, as in many modern Indo-Aryan languages it is pronounced without the vowel at the end, for example in Hindi: . The feminine name is spelled Apurva or Apoorva and is pronounced with the vowel at the end.

List of people with the name

Masculine given name
 Apurva Asrani (born 1978), Indian film director
 Apurva Agnihotri (born 1972), Indian TV actor
 Apoorva Lakhia, Indian film director
 Apoorva D. Patel, Indian physicist
 Apoorva Sengupta (1938–2013), Indian army officer and cricketer
 Apoorva Baluapuri (1986–present), Indian-German-American researcher

Feminine given name
 Apoorva Arora (born 1996), Indian actress and model
 Apoorva Muralinath (born 1989), Indian basketball player

Other
 Pratiksha Apurv (born 1964), Indian painter

References

Indian feminine given names
Indian masculine given names